Oscillations Remixes is a remix album by American composer Bill Laswell, released on October 14, 1997 by Sub Rosa. It comprises remixed versions of recordings taken from Laswell's first Oscillations album.

Track listing

Personnel 
Adapted from the Oscillations Remixes liner notes.
Duke Brussels – mastering
Bill Laswell – bass guitar, drum programming, effects

Release history

References

External links 
 

1997 remix albums
Bill Laswell remix albums
Sub Rosa Records remix albums